Blastophaga is a wasp genus in the family Agaonidae (fig wasps) which pollinate figs or are otherwise associated with figs, a coevolutional relationship that has been developing for at least 80 million years. Pollinating fig wasps are specific to specific figs. The common fig Ficus carica is pollinated by Blastophaga psenes.

References 

 Proctor, M., Yeo, P. & Lack, A. (1996). The Natural History of Pollination. Timber Press, Portland, OR.

External links 
The Fig Web. Blastophaga

Agaonidae
Hymenoptera genera
Taxa named by Johann Ludwig Christian Gravenhorst

Insects described in 1829